Vietnamese literature (chữ Nôm: 文學越南) is the literature, both oral and written, created largely by the Vietnamese. Early Vietnamese literature has been greatly influenced by Chinese literature. As Literary Chinese was the formal written language for government documents, a majority of literary works were composed in Hán văn or as văn ngôn. From the 10th century, a minority of literary works were composed in chữ Nôm, the former writing system for the Vietnamese language. The Nôm script better represented Vietnamese literature as it led to the creation of different poetic forms like Lục bát and Song thất lục bát. It also allowed for Vietnamese reduplication to be used in Vietnamese poetry.

History
For a millennium before the tenth century, Vietnam was under the rule of various Chinese dynasties and as a result much of the written work during this period was in chữ Hán (Chinese characters), works written in chữ Hán were either called Hán văn or văn ngôn. Chữ Nôm, created around the tenth century, allowed writers to compose in Vietnamese using native characters that were coined by using Chinese radicals. It flourished in the 18th century when many notable Vietnamese writers and poets composed their works in chữ Nôm and when it briefly became the official written script during the Hồ dynasty and the Tây Sơn dynasty.

While the Vietnamese alphabet was created in 1631 by Francisco de Pina, it did not become popular outside of missionary groups until the early 20th century, when the French colonial administration mandated its use in French Indochina. By the mid-20th century, virtually all Vietnamese works of literature were composed in Vietnamese alphabet. Today, Francophone Vietnamese and English-speaking Vietnamese are counted by many critics as contributors to the ongoing history of Vietnamese literature.

Types

Folk literature

Unlike written literature, early oral literature was composed in Vietnamese and is still accessible to ordinary Vietnamese today. Vietnamese folk literature is an intermingling of many forms. It is not only an oral tradition, but a mixing of three media: hidden (only retained in the memory of folk authors), fixed (written), and shown (performed). Folk literature usually exist in many versions, passed down orally, and have unknown authors.

Myths consist of stories about supernatural beings, heroes, creator gods, and reflect the viewpoint of ancient people about human life. They consist of creation stories, stories about their origins (Lạc Long Quân, Âu Cơ), culture heroes (Sơn Tinh or Mountain Spirit - Thủy Tinh or Water Spirit).

Medieval literature

Hán văn

The earliest surviving literature by Vietnamese writers is written in chữ Hán (Chinese characters). Almost all of the official documents in Vietnamese history were written in chữ Hán, as were the first poems. Not only is the Chinese script foreign to modern Vietnamese speakers, these works are mostly unintelligible even when directly transliterated from Classical Chinese into the modern Vietnamese alphabet due to their Chinese grammar and vocabulary. As a result, these works must be translated into Vietnamese in order to be understood by the general public. These works include official proclamations by Vietnamese emperors, imperial histories, and declarations of independence from China, as well as Vietnamese poetry. In chronological order notable works include:
 Thiên đô chiếu 1010, Edict on transfer the capital of Đại Cồ Việt from Hoa Lư (modern Ninh Bình) to Đại La (modern Hanoi). 
 Nam quốc sơn hà 1077, Mountains and rivers of the Southern country, poem by Lý Thường Kiệt
 Đại Việt sử ký, Annals of Đại Việt by Lê Văn Hưu, 1272
 Dụ chư tì tướng hịch văn, Proclamation to the Officers, General Trần Hưng Đạo, 1284
 An Nam chí lược, Abbreviated Records of Annam, anon. 1335
 Gia huấn ca, The Family Training Ode, a 976-line Confucian morality poem attributed to Nguyễn Trãi 1420s
 Lĩnh Nam chích quái, "The wonderful tales of Lĩnh Nam" 14th Century, edited Vũ Quỳnh (1452-1516)
 Đại Việt sử lược, Abbreviated History of Đại Việt, anon. 1377
 Việt điện u linh tập, Spirits of the Departed in the Viet Realm, Lý Tế Xuyên 1400
 Bình Ngô đại cáo, Great Proclamation upon the Pacification of the Wu Forces, Nguyễn Trãi 1428 
 Đại Việt sử ký toàn thư, Complete Annals of Đại Việt, Ngô Sĩ Liên 1479.
 Truyền kỳ mạn lục (Collection of Strange Tales, partly by Nguyễn Dữ, 16th century 
 Hoàng Lê nhất thống chí, Unification Records of the Le Emperor, historical novel ending with Gia Long. anon.
 Chinh phụ ngâm, "Lament of the soldier's wife",  the original Chinese version by Đặng Trần Côn d.1745
 Đại Việt thông sử, history by Lê Quý Đôn 1749
 Vân đài loại ngữ, encyclopedia by Lê Quý Đôn 1773
 Phủ biên tạp lục, Frontier Chronicles by Lê Quý Đôn 1776
 Việt Nam vong quốc sử, by Phan Bội Châu in Japan in 1905

Some of these Literary Chinese texts are still taught in school. For example, the poem Nam quốc sơn hà by Lý Thường Kiệt, is in the textbook used by schools in Vietnam. The texts are generally and commonly is divided into three sections.

Phiên âm (Phonetic transliteration) - this section contains the original text transliterated into the Vietnamese alphabet. This section is not understood by any Vietnamese, as the text is in Literary Chinese which uses Classical Chinese syntax and vocabulary not used in Vietnamese.

Dịch nghĩa (Translated meaning) - this section contains the translation of the poem, it is understood by Vietnamese speakers. It is often just a direct translation rather than a full fledged translated poem.

Dịch thơ (Translated poem) - this section contains the translation version of the poem. It is understood by Vietnamese speakers and is a full fledged translated poem.

Nôm
Works written in chữ Nôm - a locally invented demotic script based on chữ Hán - was developed for writing the spoken Vietnamese language from the 13th Century onwards. For the most part, these chữ Nôm texts can be directly transliterated into the modern chữ Quốc ngữ and be readily understood by modern Vietnamese speakers. However, since chữ Nôm was never standardized, there are ambiguities as to which words are meant when a writer used certain characters. This resulted in many variations when transliterating works in chữ Nôm into Vietnamese alphabet. Some highly regarded works in Vietnamese literature were written in chữ Nôm, including Nguyễn Du's Truyện Kiều (傳翹), Đoàn Thị Điểm's chữ nôm translation of the poem Chinh Phụ Ngâm Khúc ( - Song of the Soldier's Wife) from the Classical Chinese poem composed by her friend Đặng Trần Côn (famous in its own right), and poems by the renowned poet Hồ Xuân Hương.

Other notable works include:
 Chinh phụ ngâm, "Lament of the soldier's wife", translations from Chinese into vernacular chữ Nôm by several translators including Phan Huy Ích and Đoàn Thị Điểm
 Cung oán ngâm khúc, "Song of the Sorrowful Concubine" by Nguyễn Gia Thiều, d.1798
 Hạnh Thục ca, "Song of Exile to Thục" Nguyễn Thị Bích, 1885
 Lục súc tranh công, "The Quarrel of the Six Beasts"
 Lục Vân Tiên, epic poem by the blind poet Nguyễn Đình Chiểu, d.1888
 Nhị độ mai, "The Plum Tree Blossoms Twice"
 Phạm Công – Cúc Hoa, Tale of Phạm Công and Cúc Hoa
 Phạm Tải – Ngọc Hoa, Tale of the orphan Phạm Tải and princess Ngọc Hoa
 Phan Trần, The clan of Phan and the clan of Trần
 Quốc âm thi tập, "National pronunciation poetry collection" attributed to Nguyễn Trãi after retirement
 Thạch Sanh tân truyện, anon. 18th century
 Tống Trân and Cúc Hoa(), Tale of Tống Trân and his wife Cúc Hoa
 Trinh thử, "The Virgin Mouse", Hò̂ Huyè̂n Qui, 15th century
 Hoa tiên, The Flowered Letter, based on the late 17th century Chinese poem, Faazin Gei.

Modern literature

While created in the seventeenth century, the Vietnamese alphabet was not widely used outside of missionary circles until the early 20th century, when the French colonial government mandated its use in French Indochina. During the early years of the twentieth century, many periodicals in Vietnamese alphabet flourished and their popularity helped popularize Vietnamese alphabet. While some leaders resisted the popularity of Vietnamese alphabet as an imposition from the French, others embraced it as a convenient tool to boost literacy. After declaring independence from France in 1945, Empire of Vietnam's provisional government adopted a policy of increasing literacy with Vietnamese alphabet. Their efforts were hugely successful, as the literacy rate jumped overnight.

In those early years, there were many variations in orthography and there was no consensus on how to write certain words. After some conferences, the issues were mostly settled, but some still linger to this day. By the mid-20th century, all Vietnamese works of literature are written in Vietnamese alphabet, while works written in earlier scripts are transliterated into Vietnamese alphabet for accessibility to modern Vietnamese speakers. The use of the earlier scripts is now limited to historical references.

Works in modern Vietnamese include:
 Việt Nam sử lược by Trần Trọng Kim, 1921
 Số đỏ by Vũ Trọng Phụng, 1936
 Mechanics and Crafts of the People of Annam, 1908 (Vietnamese is written in chữ Nôm.)

See also

 Vietnamese art
 Vietnamese poetry
 Censorship in Vietnam

References

 Viettouch. This site is dedicated to the promotion of Vietnamese history and culture; see reviews of the site.
 Culture of Vietnam encyclopedia
Việt-Học Thư-Quán - Institute of Vietnamese Studies - Viện Việt Học Many pdfs of Vietnamese literature books
 https://web.archive.org/web/20121112121058/http://thanglong.ece.jhu.edu/vhvn.html
 Translating Vietnamese poetry
 Vietnamese Poetry Collection

 
L